In homological algebra, Zeeman's comparison theorem, introduced by Christopher Zeeman,  gives conditions for a morphism of spectral sequences to be an isomorphism.

Statement

Illustrative example 
As an illustration, we sketch the proof of Borel's theorem, which says the cohomology ring of a classifying space is a polynomial ring.

We have:  since EG is contractible. We also have a theorem of Hopf stating that , an exterior algebra generated by finitely many homogeneous elements.

Let . Since the cohomology commutes with tensor products as we are working over a field,  is again a spectral sequence such that . Then we let

Note, by definition, f gives the isomorphism  A crucial point is that f is a "ring homomorphism"; this rests on the technical conditions that  are "transgressive" (cf. Hatcher for detailed discussion on this matter.) After this technical point is taken care, we conclude:  as ring by the comparison theorem; that is,

References

Spectral sequences
Theorems in algebraic topology